The flier (Centrarchus macropterus) is a species of freshwater ray-finned fish, a sunfish from the family Centrarchidae which is endemic to the southern United States of America. It is the only species in the monospecific genus Centrarchus. A Second World War United States Navy submarine was named the USS Flier after this fish.

Description
The flier is a small, strongly  compressed species of sunfish which has a moderately sized, oblique mouth. The dorsal fin has 11-13 spines and 12-14 soft rays while the anal fin has 7-8 spines and 13-15 soft rays. It has a lateral line and the scales are ctenoid. The flanks have a scattering of dark spots, the underside is pale, and the upperparts are olive in color. There is a vertical dark line through the eye which continues below the eye in what has been described as a "teardrop". Fish of a standard length less than around  have an obvious dark eyespot, or ocellus, which has a reddish margin on the soft part of the dorsal fin. The pectoral and pelvic fins are dusky with paler reticulations.

Distribution
The flier is found in the southern part of the United States along the Atlantic seaboard from  the Potomac River drainage in Maryland, where it was most likely introduced to central Florida. It is then found along the Gulf of Mexico drainages as far west as the Trinity River, Texas, and then north in Mississippi River system to above the fall line in  southern Illinois and southern Indiana.

Habitat and biology
The flier is found in clear, acidic waters including ponds in swamps, sloughs, oxbows, slow-flowing creeks and steams. They feed largely on invertebrates including insects, snails, worms and leeches although they will also eat smaller fishes and some phytoplankton. Breeding normally occurs March to May when the water temperature reaches  but it has been recorded as early as February. The gravid females have been collected from a variety of habitat including debris filled ditches with soft bottoms as well as gravel bottomed streams and heavily vegetated sand and gravel pits. They will spawn in a variety of water conditions ranging from free-flowing clear or turbid water through stagnant water in ditches and pools. Fliers create nests in rocks or gravel and surround their eggs with a round adhesive egg envelope. They are colonial nesters, nesting in aggregations with the nests quite closely spaced. The male parent guards the eggs and newly hatched fry. If they are frightened or alarmed, these fish will look for shelter among aquatic vegetation, submerged tree roots or mats of floating vegetation.

Taxonomy and etymology
The flier was first formally described by the French naturalist Bernard Germain de Lacépède (1756-1825) in 1801 as Labrus macropterus with the type locality given as South Carolina. In 1829 Georges Cuvier placed it in the genus Centrarchus. The genus Centrarchus is the sister taxon to the Archoplites and in turn these two are sister to Pomoxis. The generic name is a compound of the Greek kentron meaning "sting" and archos meaning "anus", a reference to the long spines in the anal fin. The specific name macropterus is also Greek and means "long fin".

Cultural references
A Gato-class submarine, USS Flier, built in 1943, was named for this species.

See also
Centrarchiformes

References

"Flier (Centrarchus Macropterus)." RSS. N.p., n.d. Web. 22 Apr. 2014. <http://www.tpwd.state.tx.us/huntwild/wild/species/flier/>.

Page, L. M., H. Espinosa-Perez, L. T. Findley, C. R. Gilbert, R. N. Lea, N. E. Mandrak, R. L. Mayden, and J. S. Nelson. 2013. Common and scientific names of the fishes from the United States, Canada, and Mexico, 7th Edition. American Fisheries Society, Special Publication 34, Bethesda Maryland.

"Virginia Department of Game and Inland Fisheries." Flier (Centrarchus Macropterus). N.p., n.d. Web. 22 Apr. 2014. <https://web.archive.org/web/20140501143348/http://www.dgif.virginia.gov/wildlife/fish/details.asp?fish=010176>.

Centrarchinae
Freshwater fish of the Southeastern United States
Fauna of the Southeastern United States
Fish described in 1801
Freshwater fish of North America